Arthur C. Brooks (born May 21, 1964) is an American author, public speaker, and academic. Brooks served as the 11th President of the American Enterprise Institute. He is the author of twelve books, including Love Your Enemies (2019), The Conservative Heart (2015), and The Road to Freedom (2012), and From Strength to Strength: Finding Success, Happiness and Deep Purpose in the Second Half of Life. Since 2020, he has written for the Atlantic’s How to Build a Life column on happiness and hosted its podcast, How to Build a Happy Life. 

In 2019, he began work at the Harvard Kennedy School as the William Henry Bloomberg Professor of the Practice of Public Leadership and at the Harvard Business School as a Professor of Management Practice and Faculty Fellow.

Early life and education
Brooks was born on May 21, 1964, in Spokane, Washington, to David C. Brooks, a mathematics professor, and Jacqueline Brooks, an artist. When he was very young, his family moved to Seattle, where he spent his childhood.

Brooks was a professional French hornist into his early thirties.

Brooks returned to school in his late twenties to earn a bachelor’s degree in economics, via distance learning, from Thomas Edison State College, while continuing his work as a professional musician. He then earned master’s degree in economics from Florida Atlantic University while also working full time.  

In 1998, Brooks earned his MPhil and PhD in public policy analysis from the RAND Graduate School in Santa Monica, California, while working at the RAND Corporation as a military operations research analyst for Project Air Force. Brooks has since been awarded honorary doctorates from Saint Thomas Aquinas College in 2020, Brigham Young University in 2019, Claremont McKenna College in 2019, Hampden-Sydney College in 2018, Jacksonville University in 2018, Ave Maria University in 2015, and Thomas Edison State College in 2013.

Career

Georgia State University & Syracuse University 
Brooks began his academic career in 1998 at Georgia State University as an assistant professor of public administration and economics. From 2001 to 2008, he taught at Syracuse University, where he was made a full professor in 2006, and was named the Louis A. Bantle Professor of Business and Government Policy in 2007. He held a joint appointment at the Maxwell School of Citizenship and Public Affairs and the Martin J. Whitman School of Management. During his tenure at Syracuse, Brooks published over 60 peer-reviewed articles and four books.

American Enterprise Institute 
From 2009 to 2019, Brooks served as the 11th President and Beth and Ravenel Curry Scholar in Free Enterprise for the American Enterprise Institute (AEI).

Harvard University 
In 2018, Brooks announced his resignation from AEI, writing in a Wall Street Journal op-ed that "social enterprises generally thrive best when chief executives don't stay much longer than a decade, because it's important to refresh the organizational vision periodically and avoid becoming uniquely associated with one person." Since 2019, he has taught at the Harvard Kennedy School and at the Harvard Business School. His "Leadership and Happiness" class at Harvard has gained immense popularity and attention in the press.

Recent work

From Strength to Strength 
In February 2022, Brooks published From Strength to Strength: Finding Happiness, Success, and Deep Purpose in the Second Half of Life. Brooks’ ideas on happiness research on aging professionals were first introduced to the public in a 2019 Atlantic article, “Your Professional Decline Is Coming (Much) Sooner Than You Think". From Strength to Strength debuted at #1 on the New York Times bestseller list, where it remained for several months. It received widespread attention, including from Oprah Winfrey, who recommended the book, and was endorsed by the Dalai Lama.

Happiness research 
Brooks began focusing intensively on the study of happiness following his professional move from AEI to Harvard, where he taught classes in happiness, also writing weekly on the subject in The Atlantic. He also began hosting podcasts on happiness such as How to Build a Happy Life.

Love Your Enemies 
In 2019, Brooks published Love Your Enemies: How Decent People Can Save America from the Culture of Contempt, which he describes as an antidote to the toxic political culture he found in the United States, especially after the 2016 election. With ideas based in behavioral research, ancient philosophy, and his own experience as the president of AEI, Brooks encourages a culture of love and respectful disagreement for political and economic progress and shows how this can be done. Love Your Enemies was a national bestseller and was included in Politico’s “Top Books of 2019.”

The Pursuit 
Brooks was the subject of the 2019 documentary The Pursuit. This film follows Brooks around the world as he searches for answers to issues of global poverty.

Personal 
Brooks is married to Ester Munt-Brooks, a native of Barcelona. They have three adult children and two daughters-in-law. They live in Needham, Massachusetts. He is a practicing Roman Catholic. In the past he has been registered as both Democrat and Republican; he now identifies as Independent.

Bibliography
 
 Kevin F. McCarthy, Elizabeth H. Ondaatje, Laura Zakaras, and Arthur C. Brooks. Gifts of the Muse: Reframing the Debate about the Benefits of the Arts. Santa Monica, Calif.: Rand Corporation, 2004.
 Arthur C. Brooks, ed. Gifts of Time and Money: The Role of Charity in America's Communities. Lanham, Md.: Rowman & Littlefield, 2005.
 Kevin F. McCarthy, Elizabeth H. Ondaatje, Arthur C. Brooks, and Andras Szanto. A Portrait of the Visual Arts: Meeting the Challenges of a New Era. Santa Monica, Calf.: Rand Corporation, 2005.
 Arthur C. Brooks. Who Really Cares: The Surprising Truth About Compassionate Conservatism. New York: Basic Books, 2006.
 Arthur C. Brooks. Gross National Happiness: Why Happiness Matters for America—and How We Can Get More of It. New York: Basic Books, 2008.
 Arthur C. Brooks. Social Entrepreneurship: A Modern Approach to Social Value Creation. Upper Saddle River, N.J.: Prentice-Hall, 2008.
 Arthur C. Brooks. The Battle: How the Fight between Big Government and Free Enterprise Will Shape America's Future. New York: Basic Books, 2010.
 Arthur C. Brooks. The Road to Freedom: How to Win the Fight for Free Enterprise. New York: Basic Books, 2012.
 Arthur C. Brooks. The Conservative Heart: How to Build a Fairer, Happier, and More Prosperous America. New York: Broadside Books, 2015.
 Arthur C. Brooks. Love Your Enemies: How Decent People Can Save America from the Culture of Contempt. New York: Broadside Books, 2019.
 
 Arthur C. Brooks. From Strength to Strength, Finding Happiness, Success, and Deep Purpose in the Second Half of Life. New York: Portfolio/Penguin, 2022.

Filmography
 The Pursuit (2019)

References

External links

 Arthur C. Brooks's profile at the American Enterprise Institute's website
 Brooks's personal website
 
 How to Build a Happy Life

1964 births
Living people
American classical horn players
American Enterprise Institute
American libertarians
American Roman Catholics
The Atlantic (magazine) people
Catholic libertarians
Converts to Roman Catholicism
Florida Atlantic University alumni
Libertarian theorists
Musicians from Seattle
Musicians from Spokane, Washington
RAND Corporation people
Syracuse University faculty
Thomas Edison State University alumni
Washington, D.C., Democrats
Washington, D.C., Republicans